Clavulina brunneocinerea is a species of coral fungus in the family Clavulinaceae. It occurs in New Zealand.

References

Fungi described in 1988
Fungi of New Zealand
brunneocinerea
Taxa named by Ron Petersen